Golia is a surname. Notable people with the surname include:

Grigoria Golia (born 1974), Greek handball player 
Pavel Golia (1887–1959), Slovenian poet and playwright
Piero Golia (born 1974), Italian conceptual artist
Vinny Golia (born 1946), American composer and multi-instrumentalist